Schooner Creek is a stream in Brown County, Indiana, in the United States.

The stream consists of two sections: Upper Schooner Creek and Lower Schooner Creek. The river system was named for a German pioneer settler named Schoonover.

See also
List of rivers of Indiana

References

Rivers of Brown County, Indiana
Rivers of Indiana